Clube Ferroviário de Maputo, or simply Ferroviário, is a Mozambique multi sports club from Maputo especially known for its football operations but also for its basketball and roller hockey team.

History
The club was founded in 1924, as Clube Ferroviário de Lourenço Marques. In 1976, the club was renamed to Clube Ferroviário de Maputo. In 1982, the club won its first two titles, the Cup of Mozambique, and the Mozambican League. After winning the Moçambola in 2008 and in 2009, they finished in the fifth position in the 2011 edition of the league, concluded on November 6, 2011. They won the Taça de Moçambique in the same year, after they defeated Chingale de Tete in the final.

Stadium
The club plays their home matches at Estádio da Machava, which has a maximum capacity of 45,000 people.

Achievements
 Moçambola
Colonial champions:
Winners (8): 1956, 1961, 1963, 1966, 1967, 1968, 1970, 1972
Since independence:
Winners (10): 1982, 1989, 1996, 1997, 1998–99, 2002, 2005, 2008, 2009, 2015

 Cup of Mozambique
 Winners (5): 1984, 1989, 2004, 2009, 2011

 Maputo Honour Cup
 Winners (2): 2001–02, 2005

Performance in African competitions
 CAF Champions League: 6 appearances

1997 - Group Stage
1998 - Second Round

2000 - Second Round
2003 - First Round

2006 - First Round
2009 - Preliminary Round

 African Cup of Champions Clubs: 2 appearances
1983 - Second Round
1990 - First Round

 CAF Confederation Cup: 3 appearances
2004 - Preliminary Round
2005 - First Round
2012 - First Round

 CAF Cup Winners' Cup: 1 appearance
1994 - First Round

 CAF Cup:7 appearances

1992 - Semi-finals
1993 - First Round
1994 - Second Round

1995 - Quarter-finals
1996 - Second Round
2001 - Quarter-finals

2002 - First Round

Basketball team

The club has a strong basketball team. Several of the club's players have represented different national teams at the FIBA Africa Championships. Octavio Magolico, for example, has played for the Mozambique national basketball team and Cedrick Kalombo has played for the South Africa national basketball team.

References 

 
Association football clubs established in 1924
Ferroviario
1924 establishments in Mozambique
Basketball teams in Africa
Ferroviário de Maputo